Dieter Quester (born 30 May 1939 in Vienna) is an active touring car racing driver from Austria. Dieter has participated in 53 24-Hour Races. He competed in a single Formula One race in which he finished ninth.

Starting with motorboats in the 1950s, he became part of the Formula 2 team of BMW which intended to take part in the 1969 German Grand Prix. Teammate Gerhard Mitter was killed at the Nürburgring while practising with the BMW 269, though. As a suspension or steering failure was suspected, the BMW team with Quester and Hubert Hahne withdrew from the race, as did Mitter's teammate at Porsche, Hans Herrmann.

Quester participated in his home 1974 Austrian Grand Prix on 18 August 1974. He out-qualified his three team mates at Surtees and finished 9th ahead of Hans-Joachim Stuck and double World Champion Graham Hill in the race, but scored no championship points.

Quester then focused again on European Touring Car Championship to drive a BMW 3.0 CSL for Schnitzer Motorsport. Quester had already won the 1973 Spa 24 Hours. Later racing in the DTM, he once slid on the roof of his BMW M3 over the start/finish line of the AVUS for a 3rd place.

His career was still active at age 70, sponsored by Red Bull. On 15 January 2006 he won the 24 Hours race at the Dubai Autodrome on a BMW M3 together with Hans-Joachim Stuck, Philipp Peter and Toto Wolff. Stuck and Quester returned in the 24 Hours Nürburgring, but their BMW was destroyed in a crash at night that involved an oil spill and seven cars. During the weekend of 9–10 September 2006, he won the Britcar 24 Hours of Silverstone in a Duller Motorsport BMW M Roadster#Z4 M Roadster (2006–2008), and on 14 January 2007 he again won the 24 Hours race at the Dubai Autodrome in the Duller Motorsport BMW Z4 (E85). In September 2007 he and Duller won the 24 Hours of Silverstone in the Duller BMW Z4 (E85), by a margin of 30 laps.

Quester took part in his final race at the HSR Classic Daytona in November 2018 at the age of 79.

Racing record

Complete European Formula Two Championship results
(key) (Races in bold indicate pole position; races in italics indicate fastest lap)

Complete Formula One results
(key) (Races in bold indicate pole position, races in italics indicate fastest lap)

Complete British Saloon Car Championship results
(key) (Races in bold indicate pole position; races in italics indicate fastest lap.)

† Events with 2 races staged for the different classes.|}

Complete 24 Hours of Le Mans results

Complete Deutsche Tourenwagen Meisterschaft results
(key) (Races in bold indicate pole position) (Races in italics indicate fastest lap)

Complete Super Tourenwagen Cup results
(key) (Races in bold indicate pole position) (Races in italics indicate fastest lap)

Complete FIA GT Championship results
(key) (Races in bold indicate pole position) (Races in italics indicate fastest lap)

Britcar 24 Hour results

References

External links

 Biography at F1 Rejects
 https://web.archive.org/web/20060522051555/http://bmw-motorsport.com/ms/en/fascination/history/bmw_touring/heroes/index.html
 https://web.archive.org/web/20060627021546/http://www.john-w.de/bmwf2/

Austrian racing drivers
Austrian Formula One drivers
BMW (1950s–60s) Formula One drivers
Surtees Formula One drivers
European Formula Two Championship drivers
Austrian motorboat racers
1939 births
Living people
24 Hours of Le Mans drivers
World Touring Car Championship drivers
Sportspeople from Vienna
World Sportscar Championship drivers
24 Hours of Spa drivers
European Touring Car Championship drivers
24 Hours of Daytona drivers
Britcar 24-hour drivers
Oreca drivers
BMW M drivers
Schnitzer Motorsport drivers
Sauber Motorsport drivers
24H Series drivers